Harris Martin (2 April 1865 District of Columbia – 26 April 1903 Saint Paul, Minnesota)  was an African American boxer known as "The Black Pearl" who was the first colored middleweight champion of the world.

Martin declared himself the world colored middleweight champion after beating "Black Frank" Taylor in Minneapolis, Minnesota on 2 May 1887, when he knocked out Taylor in the 38th or 40th round of their bout. The Black Pearl and Black Frank had fought six times between 22 December 1886 and the title bout; Martin lost their first fight, won the second, then drew the next four contests. (They then fought an exhibition.)

After beating Taylor, Martin declared himself the World Colored Middleweight Champion. (They fought one more time that December, a bout that resulted in a draw.) Harris lost his title to Ed Binney on 30 November 1891  in San Francisco, California. On 29 February 1892, he was defeated by Charley Turner, "The Stockton Cyclone", who claimed the title but never defended it.  Binney was considered the lineal champ.

Martin racked up a career record of 53 wins (with 39 K.O.s) against 11 losses (K.O.-ed seven times) and 15 draws. He lost one newspaper decision.

Professional boxing record
All information in this section is derived from BoxRec, unless otherwise stated.

Official record

All newspaper decisions are officially regarded as “no decision” bouts and are not counted to the win/loss/draw column.

Unofficial record

Record with the inclusion of newspaper decisions to the win/loss/draw column.

References

African-American boxers
Middleweight boxers
World colored middleweight boxing champions
1865 births
1903 deaths
American male boxers
Boxers from Minnesota
20th-century African-American people